was a Japanese professional track racing cyclist.

Matsumoto is the leading all-time winner amongst professional Keirin track racers with a career total of 1341 wins.

Matsumoto started as a cyclist in 1949, and won the national keirin championships in 1954 and 1955. He retired from racing on 1 October 1981. After retirement he trained young cyclists. He became an honorary citizen of Kyoto in 1987.

Matsumoto died on 6 March 2021 from lymphoma.

References

External links

Japanese male cyclists
Sportspeople from Kyoto Prefecture
1928 births
2021 deaths
Keirin cyclists
Deaths from cancer in Japan
Deaths from lymphoma
Place of death missing